National Route 448 is a national highway of Japan connecting Ibusuki, Kagoshima and Miyazaki, Miyazaki in Japan, with a total length of 231.1 km (143.6 mi).

References

448
Roads in Kagoshima Prefecture
Roads in Miyazaki Prefecture